Phallus callichrous is a species of fungus in the stinkhorn family found in South America. Originally named Dictyophora callichroa by German mycologist & forester Alfred Möller in 1895, American mycologist Curtis Gates Lloyd transferred it to the genus Phallus in 1907.

References

External links

Fungi described in 1895
Fungi of South America
Phallales